Peregrine Honig (born 1976 in San Francisco, CA) is an American artist whose work is concerned with the relationship between pop culture, sexual vulnerability, social anxieties, the ethics of luxury and trends in consumerism. Honig appeared on season one of Bravo’s artist reality television show, Work of Art: The Next Great Artist, which aired from June 9–August 11, 2010, finishing in second place.

Career 
Born in San Francisco and raised in The Castro, Honig went to high school at the Ruth Asawa School of the Arts, then moved to Kansas City, Missouri at 17 to attend the Kansas City Art Institute. At age 22, Honig was the youngest living artist to have work acquired by the Whitney Museum of Art’s permanent collection.

Solo exhibitions include Loser at Dwight Hackett Projects in Santa Fe, New Mexico; Pretty Babies at Gescheidle Gallery in Chicago; and Albocracy at Jet Art Works in Washington DC. Significant recent group shows include Talk Dirty to Me at Larissa Goldston Gallery (2009), Transfigure at Kemper Museum, Kansas City, Missouri (2008), Diane and Sandy Besser Collection at the de Young Museum in San Francisco, California (2007). Her work has been show internationally with Gallery Akinci in Amsterdam and Gallery Arcaute in Monterey, Mexico.

Honig's work is included in private and public collections, including: The Art Institute of Chicago, Yale University Art Gallery, The Fogg Art Museum, Milwaukee Art Museum, Whitney Museum of American Art, 21c Museum Hotel, Albright-Knox Art Gallery, The Diane and Sandy Besser Collection, and Ball State University Museum of Art.

In 1997, Honig started Fahrenheit Gallery, an artist-run space in Kansas City's industrial West Bottoms, where she showed artists with national and international reputations and inspired other young Kansas City artists to do the same.

Honig is represented by Dwight Hackett Projects in Santa Fe, New Mexico, The Nevica Project in Chicago, Illinois and Blue Gallery in Kansas City, Missouri.

Honig also owns a lingerie and swimwear boutique, Birdies, which opened in 2003, and is located in the Crossroads Section of Kansas City, Missouri.

Works 
Early sexual awakenings, the visual manifestation of disease, and the social anxieties of realized and fictional characters reveal themselves through Peregrine Honig's drawings and paintings.

Ovubet (26 Girls with Sweet Centers, 1999)
Pin Up Girls (2001–02)
Mint Forest (2003–04): Inspired by Precious Doe murder case.
Albocracy (2005)
Father Gander (2005): Honig's collection of six lithographs in her series
Mary Kate and Ashley (2007): A look at Mary-Kate and Ashley Olsen twin toddlers of Full House.
V.I.P. (2008)
Exposed (2009)
Pukers (2010)
Anchor Babies (2010)
Beautiful Boys (2010)

Projects 
Suites (2015): Following an unofficial residency at the Hotel Phillips in Kansas City where the artist created a series of drawings, Honig installed a full-scale replica of the hotel's interior inside the Belger Crane Yard Gallery. Exploring issues such as sexuality, vulnerability and luxury, she expanded the works to include prints and a video work in collaboration with videographer Johann Brooks and choreographer Jane Gotch. 
Twin Fawns (2000–current): based on taxidermied unborn twin baby fawns in a uterine glass case. The Twin Fawns exhibit exaggerated features and cartoon-like appearance. The fawns are depicted as sleeping peacefully in an artificial glass womb-like case constructed by the artist.
Bravo's Work of Art: The Next Great Artist (2010): Honig appeared on Work of Art: The Next Great Artist. She advanced to the final round, where she took second place after winner Abdi Farah and second runner-up, Miles Mendenhall. On the show she wore fashion by Kansas City designers Ari Fish, a contestant on Project Runway, and fashion designer, Peggy Noland. "Art is too often exclusive and inaccessible," says Barb Shelly of KansasCity.com. "Honig and her Bravo competitors are making it interesting and understandable." Two months after her defeat, Honig comes to Santa Fe with Loser, a collection of work both from and in response to her reality-show experience.

Influences 

Artists
Sally Mann
Hans Belmer
Petah Coyne
R. Crumb

Publications 
 Cindy Hoedel, The Kansas City Star, "KC artist’s ‘We Don’t Care’ gender-neutral bathroom sign installed at North Carolina hotel," April 2016
 Laura Spencer, KCUR, "Inside Kansas City Artist Peregrine Honig's Hotel Suite, The Bed's A Stage," September 2015
 Melaney Mitchell, Informality Blog, "All Is Fair on the Flip Side: A Conversation with Peregrine Honig" September 17, 2015 
 Susan Melgren, Kansas City Spaces, "Breaking Boundaries: Art and Identity. An interview with Peregrine Honig"
 Gina Kauffman, KCUR, "Intimates Store For Transgender People To Open In Kansas City's Crossroads District, December 2014
 Jessica Baran, The Riverfront Times, "Laced: Peregrine Honig," February 2013.
 Kathryn M. Davis, THE Magazine, “Peregrine Honig: Loser,” November 2010.
 Rani Molla, Santa Fe Reporter, “As Not Seen On TV,” October 13, 2010.
 The Art Reserve, “Peregrine Honig: Loser at Dwight Hackett Projects,” October 2010.
 Evan J. Garza, “Spotlight: Peregrine Honig [Editions #29, #41, #53, #71],” New American Paintings, August/September 2010.
 Jerry Saltz, New York Magazine, “Work of Art Exit Interview: Runner-up No. 1,” August 12, 2010.
 Jerry Saltz, New York Magazine, “Jerry Saltz’s Work of Art Finale Recap: Life Breaks Through,” August 11, 2010.
 Jerry Saltz, New York Magazine, “Jerry Saltz’s Work of Art Recap: Forest for the Trees,” August 4, 2010.
 Jerry Saltz, New York Magazine, “Work of Art Exit Interview: Episode Eight,” July 29, 2010.
 Jerry Saltz, New York Magazine, “Jerry Saltz’s Work of Art Recap: The Loneliest Number,” July 28, 2010.
 Jerry Saltz, New York Magazine, “Jerry Saltz’s Work of Art Recap: Suffer the Children,” July 21, 2010.
 Jerry Saltz, New York Magazine, “Work of Art Exit Interview: Episode Six,” July 15, 2010.
 Jerry Saltz, New York Magazine, “Jerry Saltz’s Work of Art Recap: Public Shaming,” July 14, 2010.
 Jerry Saltz, New York Magazine, “Jerry Saltz’s Work of Art Recap: Miles May Vary,” July 7, 2010.
 Jerry Saltz, New York Magazine, “Jerry Saltz’s Work of Art Recap: Awkward,” June 30, 2010.
 Laura Spencer, “Peregrine Honig ‘Work of Art’ interview by Laura Spencer,” KCStageBlog, June 11, 2010.
 Lori Waxman, “Peregrine Honig,” 60 Word/Min Art Critic, April 17, 2010.
 Katy Ryan, “Is Peregrine Honig ‘The Next Great Artist?’” Kansas City Free Press, April 9, 2010.
 Barb Shelly, “Peregrine Honig’s TV venture is good for art and good for Kansas City,” Kansas City.com.
 Alice Thorson, “Honig’s art takes flight with Widow,” Kansas City Star, March 1, 2010.
 Mike Miller, “Peregrine Honig's Widow, a First for Art Publisher Landfall Press,” Art Tattler, March 2010.
 Rinchen Lhamo, “Lure of the Lurid: Peregrine Honig’s Fashism,” Santa Fe Reporter, April 16, 2008.
 Alan Artner, “Peregrine Honig’s works recast world of women’s fashion as wasting, fragile,” Chicago Tribune, June 22, 2007.
 Alicia Eler, Time Out Chicago, “Artist Portrait: Peregrine Honig,” June 7–13, 2007.
 Marcus Cain, Venus Magazine, “Peregrine Honig,” 2006.
 Leigh Anne Miller, Art in America, “Peregrine Honig at JET Artworks, June/July 2006.
 Tom Collins, Albuquerque Journal, “The Buzz is Back,” April 15, 2005.
 Diane Armitage, THE Magazine, Santa Fe, New Mexico, “Draw,” May 2005.
 Zane Fischer, Santa Fe Reporter, “Drawing for Content,” April 6 –12, 2005.
 Starr Figura, “The Random and the Ordered,” exhibition essay, International Print Center, New York.
 Charles Solomon, Los Angeles Times, “Cartoons Storm the Gallery Gates,” July 22, 2004.
 Michelle Martinez, Dallas Observer, ”Wild Nights,” July 15–21, 2004.
 James Auer, Milwaukee Journal Sentinel, “Ambition Clothes ‘Remarkable Women,” April 7, 2004.
 Merritt Martin, Dallas Observer, “This Week’s Picks,” March 31, 2004.
 Tom Collins, Albuquerque Journal, “Simple Line-Drawings Come with a Message,” June 27, 2003.
 Kurt Shaw, Pittsburgh Tribune Review, “Artists Explore the Development of the Cartoon...,” January 31, 2003.
 Leslie Hoffman, Pittsburgh Pulp, “It’s All in the Timing,” January 23, 2003.
 Regina Hackett, Seattle Post Intelligencer, “Frye’s Exhibit of Figurative Artists...”, June 28, 2002.
 Christopher Leitch, Review Magazine, “Peregrine Honig: Prerogative,” March 2002.
 Robin Trafton, Kansas City Star, “Where the Sublime Meets the Everyday,” January 25, 2002.
 Krystyna Wasserman, Book as Art XIV: Temptations, National Museum of Women in the Arts, Washington, D.C., exhibition catalogue.
 Heather Lustfeldt, Art Papers Magazine, “Kansas City, Peregrine Honig,”March/April 2002, p.49.
 David DiMichele, Artweek, “Sketchy at Acuna-Hansen Gallery,” October 2001, p. 19.
 Alice Thorson, Art in America, “Peregrine Honig at Byron C. Cohen,” July 2001, p. 109.
 Elizabeth Kirsch, Kansas City Star, “Charlotte Street Fund,” November 26, 2000.
 Alice Thorson, Kansas City Star, “Quality Pays for Six Kansas City Artists,” April 2, 2000.
 Art on Paper, “Working Proof,” March–April 2000, p. 64
 Regina Hackett, Seattle Post Intelligencer, “At Two Galleries, Art’s Desire,” February 11, 2000.
 Daniel Duford, Willamette Week, “A Primer for Lolita,” October 20, 1999.
 D.K. Row, The Oregonian, “Pretty in Pink,” October 15, 1999.
 Carol Mickett, KKFI radio, “Art Radio with Carol Mickett,” August 27, 1999.
 Robin Trafton, Kansas City Star, “Summertime Smorgasbord,” July 16, 1999.
 Elizabeth Kirsch, Kansas City Star, “Shift in Perspective,” August 9, 1998.
 Victor Wishna, The Independent, “Art in Perspective,” August 8, 1998.
 Raphael Rubenstein, Perspective Kansas City, Johnson County Community College, Overland Park, KS, exhibition brochure.
 Deborah Dickson Campbell, Pitch Weekly, “Pete and Repeat,” July 30-August 5, 1998.
 Alice Thorson, Kansas City Star, “Art at the Crossroads: Every Direction is Right,”August 2, 1998.
 Elizabeth Kirsch, Kansas City Star, “Three Questions with Raphael Rubenstein,” July 9, 1998.
 Alice Thorson, Kansas City Star, “Art at the Crossroads Takes a Youthful Spin,” June 12, 1998.
 Nicole Sailor, Kansas City Star, “New Sorority Attracts Fans and Critics,” September 4, 1997.
 Deborah Dickson Campbell, Pitch Weekly, “Thank Heaven for Little Girls,” September 1997.

References

Artists from Kansas City, Missouri
20th-century American painters
21st-century American painters
Living people
1976 births
Artists from San Francisco
American women painters
20th-century American women artists
21st-century American women artists